Engraulicypris is a genus of fish in the family Cyprinidae endemic to Africa. In a study of mitochondrial genealogy, the species formerly included in Mesobola are not phylogenetically separated from Engraulicypris and therefore should also be included in Engraulicypris.

Species
There are currently 7 recognized species in this genus:
 Engraulicypris bredoi Poll, 1945 
 Engraulicypris brevianalis (Boulenger, 1908)  (river sardine)
 Engraulicypris gariepinus Barnard, 1943 
 Engraulicypris howesi Riddin, I. R. Bills & Villet, 2016 
 Engraulicypris ngalala Riddin, Villet & I. R. Bills, 2016 
 Engraulicypris sardella (Günther, 1868) (Lake Malawi sardine)
 Engraulicypris spinifer R. G. Bailey & Matthes, 1971  (Malagarasi sardine)

References

 
Cyprinidae genera
Taxa named by Albert Günther
Taxonomy articles created by Polbot